George Alexander Gale,  (June 24, 1906July 25, 1997) was a Chief Justice for the province of Ontario, Canada from 1967 until his 1976 retirement from that post.

Born in Quebec City, he would move to Vancouver, British Columbia for his youth before settling in Toronto for his legal career.

Education and career time line
1929: Gale graduated from the University of Toronto where he received his Bachelor of Arts
1932: Formally became a lawyer following further studies at the Osgoode Hall Law School
1944: Became partner of Toronto legal firm Donald, Mason, Weir & Foulds (today known as WeirFoulds LLP)
1946: Designated King's Counsel in 1946
30 October 1946: Became a judge for the Trial Division of Ontario's High Court of Justice
1952: King's Counsel designation became Queen's Counsel upon the 1952 accession of Queen Elizabeth II
1956: Chief editor for what would be known as "Holmestead & Gale", a rewriting of Ontario's court rules
1963: Became member of the Ontario Court of Appeal
1 June 1964: Became Chief Justice of Ontario's High Court of Justice
21 September 1967: Became Chief Justice of Ontario, the province's highest judicial position
1968: Joined executive of the Canadian Judicial Council
1969: Judicial Council of Ontario is created with Gale as its first Chairman
1976: Retired as Chief Justice of Ontario, subsequently joining the Ontario Law Reform Commission as vice-chair
1979: Joined the (Ontario) Premier's Advisory Committee on Confederation

Other roles
From 1956, he also served for a long term on the Board of Governors of Wycliffe College, a Toronto theological school affiliated with the Anglican Church of Canada. He was also active within that church denomination as a member and Churchwarden (1956–1960) of Toronto's St John's York Mills parish.

Gale donated a trophy in 1973 for a competition which is today known as the Gale Cup Moot which demonstrates skills in legal argumentation using staged proceedings.

Brother in Delta Kappa Epsilon fraternity (Alpha Phi, University of Toronto)

Honours
 1969: Honorary Doctor of Laws, York University
 1977: Companion of the Order of Canada

References

External links
Harry Palmer Gallery: George Alexander Gale
 Gale Cup Moot (Fraser Milner Casgrain LLP news release, CNW Group, 20 February 2006)

1906 births
1997 deaths
Judges in Ontario
University of Toronto alumni
Companions of the Order of Canada
Canadian King's Counsel
Osgoode Hall Law School alumni